Douglas Dold (13 December 1895 – 2 October 1980) was a South African cricketer. He played in two first-class matches for Eastern Province in 1922/23 and 1924/25.

See also
 List of Eastern Province representative cricketers

References

1895 births
1980 deaths
South African cricketers
Eastern Province cricketers
People from Makhanda, Eastern Cape
Cricketers from the Eastern Cape